Bradley Creek is a stream in the U.S. state of Wisconsin. It is a tributary to the Little Wolf River. It is unknown why the name "Bradley Creek" was applied to this stream. A variant name is "North Branch Little Wolf River".

References

Rivers of Wisconsin
Rivers of Portage County, Wisconsin
Rivers of Waupaca County, Wisconsin